Ali Şahin may refer to:

Politics 

 Ali Şahin (politician, born 1921) (1921–1972), Member of Parliament for Gaziantep from DP
 Ali Şahin (politician, born 1934), Member of Parliament for Kahramanmaraş from SHP and CHP
 Ali Şahin (politician, born 1970), Member of Parliament for Gaziantep from AKP

Sports 
 Ali Şahin (wrestler) (born 1944), Turkish olympic wrestler

See also 
 Mehmet Ali Şahin